Shayne Oliver is a fashion designer, musician, and creative director, based in New York City. Oliver is the co-founder and design director of Hood By Air, a fashion brand he established together with designer Raul Lopez in 2006. In 2013, Oliver was named among The 25 Greatest Black Fashion Designers by Complex.

Early years and education 

Oliver was born in 1988, in Minnesota. After spending several years in Trinidad as a child, he then moved to Brooklyn in 2000. From the age of thirteen Oliver began going to clubs and attending DJ nights. During this time he met and engaged with many people he would later collaborate with, including many of the queer artists who would influence his creative output in years to come.

As a teenager, Oliver attended the Harvey Milk High School, an East Village public school designed for, though not limited to, gay, lesbian, bisexual, and transgender young people who may be at risk in their own communities. Through his experiences at the school, Oliver became involved in the Ballroom scene, where he was taken under the wing of prominent dancer, Willi Ninja. Oliver began voguing, and joined the House of Ninja, before moving onto the House of Kahn and the House of Mizrahi. Oliver eventually departed from the scene but remained inspired by the culture and music at its core.

In 2005 Oliver made the acquaintance of artist Dash Snow, fostering a relationship that led to Oliver showing some of his early Hood By Air designs at Snow's gallery in 2006. At the same time, Oliver was attending New York University, where he pursued an interest in performance art. During this time he began collaborating with artist Rashaad Newsome. Combining his interests in fashion and performance, Oliver started making his own looks for performances at Newsome's shows, with the artist viewing Oliver as a muse. At this stage, Oliver was making clothes primarily to perform in. Over time however, these designs began to form as part of ready-to-wear collections which would eventually be released under the Hood By Air brand.

After his time at New York University, Oliver attended the Fashion Institute of Technology (FIT) and left after one semester.

From 2009, whilst working on HBA, Oliver was involved with GHE20G0TH1K, a club night launched by Jazmin Soto, aka Venus X, in New York City. It was at these nights that Oliver popularized his style of DJing, Oliver who is self taught, used the CDJs as an instrument by playing with tempos and cues, which  influenced how audiences came to perceive the  GHE20G0TH1K sound. Oliver also met several future collaborators at GHE20G0TH1K parties, including Arca [link], who would become a frequent collaborator on Hood By Air soundtracks. At the time, Oliver took inspiration from the way that French fashion designer Hedi Slimane would incorporate music and bands into the lifestyle that surrounded his clothing. Oliver and Arca sought to create a parallel lifestyle through their music and fashion crossover.

Creation of Hood By Air 
Oliver co-founded Hood By Air in 2006 with fellow designer, Raul Lopez. Initially designing graphic t-shirts and sweatshirts which sold at boutiques such as OAK NYC, Seven New York, and Opening Ceremony, the brand quickly amassed a cult following. Under Oliver's direction, Hood By Air (also known by the acronym, HBA), soon began expanding into ready-to-wear collections, displaying Oliver's technical design ability and becoming synonymous with diverse cultural reference points including queer culture and the ballroom scene, New York nightlife, high art, and elements of skate and street culture.

Oliver, through Hood By Air, has been credited by fashion magazine Dazed with "changing the face of fashion". Interview Magazine stated that by "[perfecting] the union of streetwear and high fashion" Shayne "helped create the global merchandising blueprint for menswear today". Hood By Air is notable for its merging of art, music, and fashion through its design references as well as through performance art elements at its shows. Models at Hood By Air shows have included rapper A$AP Rocky, designer Telfar Clemens, artist Wolfgang Tilmans, and performance artist Boychild. Show soundtracks have been composed and performed by Arca, Total Freedom, Venus X, and Oliver himself.

From 2012 to 2017 the brand showed regularly at both New York Fashion Week and Paris Fashion Week, as well as presenting at the Italian menswear trade show, Pitti Uomo, in 2017.

In mid 2017, Oliver announced a hiatus period for Hood By Air, a decision that was informed by structural challenges within the business, and a desire to temporarily create outside of a singular brand structure.

In 2020, Oliver then announced the relaunch of Hood By Air under a new business structure. In 2021 Hood By Air released its first campaign imagery following its return from hiatus, featuring supermodel, Naomi Campbell.

Design Roles 

During a three-year period of hiatus from Hood By Air, Oliver worked with several international fashion houses in design and creative direction roles.

Helmut Lang 
In 2017, Oliver was approached by Isabella Burley, editor-in-residence at Helmut Lang. Burley offered Oliver a design residency at the company, which Oliver accepted. In September 2017, Oliver unveiled the brand's Spring 2018 ready-to-wear collection at New York Fashion Week, reworking pieces known as Helmut Lang standards in Oliver's own design language. In addition to the ready-to-wear collection, Oliver also created a capsule inspired by band tour merch, billed as Helmut Lang Seen by Shayne Oliver Autumn Tour Merch.

Diesel 
Following his tenure at Helmut Lang, Oliver briefly worked with Italian fashion brand, Diesel. In March 2018 Oliver and Diesel released a collaborative capsule collection as part of the Diesel Red Tag Project. Here, Oliver subverted Americana staples with his intricate reworking of denim apparel.

Longchamp 
A collaboration with Longchamp, released in May 2018, saw Oliver put his spin on the French luxury leather goods brand. In a collection that encompassed clothes, shoes, and bags, Oliver played with the brand's luxury design vocabulary, placing recognisable tenets of the brand such as leather luggage handles onto the sleeves of jackets.

Colmar 
Oliver also collaborated with heritage activewear label, Colmar, in 2018. Working on the Colmar A.G.E (Advanced Garment Exploration) line, Oliver reached into the label's extensive archive and reinterpreted a series of unisex styles, inspired by ‘alpine nostalgia’, for FW18.  Oliver described the collaboration as "juggling the iconic products of Colmar with my sense of performance and a unisex approach to wearing fashion".

Anonymous Club 
Shayne Oliver is the creative director of Anonymous Club, a creative studio established in 2020 and formalised as part of the Hood By Air relaunch. Led by Oliver, the studio operates with a collective structure, providing residencies to creative talent in order to execute artistic projects together. Anonymous Club plays a role in shaping Hood By Air's wider brand  through creative collaborations between the brand and others. In 2022, they launched their first presentation as Anonymous Club at The Shed in New York City called Headless: The Demonstration.

Creative Projects And Aliases 

 Shayne Oliver inhabits and performs as Leech, a musical avatar which has also been embodied by Anonymous Club residents Boychild and Josh Johnson. In September 2020 Oliver, as Leech, released the single ‘In The Mood’.
 Between 2008 and 2009, Oliver formed the band CHLDRN (also known as Children) with  New York-based artist, musician and composer, Fatima Al Qadiri.
 Oliver has worked on various musical projects with Arca. Alongside working together on Hood By Air soundtracks, the duo have released music under the project names 88 and Wench. Oliver and Arca also worked on music for the 2020 documentary film, Shakedown, directed by Leilah Weinraub.

Awards 

●     2014 LVMH Special Jury Prize

●     2015 CFDA Swarovski Award for Menswear.

●     2021 Nominated as a candidate for Cooper Hewitt, Smithsonian Design Museum

References

Living people
American fashion designers
American musicians
1988 births